Jeffrey J. Fell (born June 20, 1956, in Hamilton, Ontario, Canada) is a retired jockey and a Canadian Horse Racing Hall of Fame inductee who was also a successful rider in the United States.

On June 17, 1978, Jeffrey Fell rode Tiller to victory in the Bowling Green Handicap in which the Belmont Park turf course record was broken with a time of 2:13 flat for the mile and three-eighths. At the same racetrack, on July 2 Fell was again aboard Tiller for the win in the Tidal Handicap with a time of 2:13 3/5 for the mile and three-eighths.

References

 April 12, 1982 Sports Illustrated article titled "In One Fell Swoop"
 March 11, 1990 Ocala Star-Banner newspaper article on Jeffrey Fell's comeback
 Jeff Fell at the Canadian Horse Racing Hall of Fame

1956 births
Living people
Avelino Gomez Memorial Award winners
Canadian jockeys
American jockeys
Sovereign Award winners
Canadian Horse Racing Hall of Fame inductees
Sportspeople from Hamilton, Ontario
Canadian emigrants to the United States